Dexter Gordon with Junior Mance at Montreux is a live album by saxophonist Dexter Gordon and pianist Junior Mance recorded at the Montreux Jazz Festival in 1970 and released on the Prestige label.

Reception
The AllMusic review by Scott Yanow stated: "This excellent CD serves as a fine all-around introduction to the music of the great tenor-saxophonist."

Track listing 
All compositions by Dexter Gordon except where noted.
 "Fried Bananas" – 8:12     
 "Sophisticated Lady" (Duke Ellington, Irving Mills, Mitchell Parish) – 7:54     
 "Rhythm-a-Ning" (Thelonious Monk) – 8:40     
 "Body and Soul" (Frank Eyton, Johnny Green, Edward Heyman, Robert Sour) – 10:15     
 "Blue Monk" (Monk) – 10:50     
 "The Panther" – 9:27 Bonus track on CD reissue

Personnel 
Dexter Gordon – tenor saxophone
Junior Mance – piano
Martin Rivera – bass
Oliver Jackson – drums

References 

1970 live albums
Prestige Records live albums
Junior Mance live albums
Dexter Gordon live albums
Albums produced by Joel Dorn
Albums produced by Michael Cuscuna
Albums recorded at the Montreux Jazz Festival